Caribbean International Network (CIN)-TV is an internationally broadcast English language television channel based in Jamaica. The main focus of the channel is Caribbean culture, news, sports, lifestyle, opinions, and entertainment.

The main emphasis of the channel is the Anglo-Caribbean demographic with a heavy emphasis on Jamaican and also Trinidad and Tobagonian content.

Beginning in January 2007, CIN announced its availability in New York City, where it broadcasts to the sizeable Caribbean-diaspora resident there. In New York, CIN is available both on cable and over the air. It is available over-the-air on WNYE and to cable systems in New York City via ch. 73. And Channel 26 on Verizon Fios Services Friday and Saturday Nights in Queens, New York.

External links
Caribbean International Network (CIN)-TV - Official website

Caribbean Media Corporation
Caribbean cable television networks
Television stations in Jamaica
English-language television stations